Som Marandi (7 January 1964 – 23 March 2022) was an Indian politician and member of the Bharatiya Janata Party. Marandi was a first term member of the Lok Sabha in 1998 from the Rajmahal constituency assembly constituency in Jharkhand.

References 

1964 births
2022 deaths
People from Pakur district
Bharatiya Janata Party politicians from Jharkhand
Members of the Jharkhand Legislative Assembly
India MPs 1998–1999